On 27 January 2023, British woman Nicola Bulley disappeared whilst walking her dog in St Michael's on Wyre, Lancashire, United Kingdom. Lancashire Constabulary said that there was no evidence of either suspicious activity or third party involvement in the disappearance and quickly stated that their working hypothesis was that she had fallen into the River Wyre. However, an extensive search of the river and surrounding land involving police divers, helicopters, sniffer dogs and drones found no body.

On 19 February, her body was found in the river by a man and a woman walking their dog, about a mile from where she was last seen. The following day, Lancashire Constabulary confirmed that the body was Bulley's. The cause of death has not yet been established.

The police were criticised for their handling of the case, including releasing private details of Bulley's health. Members of the public, particularly users of social media, were also criticised for travelling to the area during the search and for what the police described as "[playing] private detectives".

Background
Nicola Jane Bulley, aged 45, was born in Essex in 1977 and moved to Lancashire in the late 1990s. She had two daughters with her 44-year-old partner, and the family lived in the village of Inskip. Bulley was a mortgage adviser. Bulley suffered from issues relating to alcohol and perimenopause, and police and health professionals attended the family home on 10 January to respond to a "concern for welfare".

Disappearance
On Friday 27 January 2023, Bulley drove from her home to the nearby village of St Michael's on Wyre, where, after dropping her children off at school at approximately 8:40 am, she walked along the River Wyre with her springer spaniel. At 8:53, Bulley sent an email to her employer. At 8:57 she sent a text to a friend to arrange a meet-up for their children that week. She then joined a Microsoft Teams call at 9:01, keeping her phone's camera and microphone disengaged.

Bulley was last seen at approximately 9:10 on a riverside field walking with her dog off its lead. At 9:20, Bulley's phone was believed to be in the vicinity of a riverside bench. At 9:30, the Teams call was ended by its host. At 9:33, a passer-by discovered Bulley's mobile phone (which was still connected to the call) on the bench. Bulley's dog was found alone near the bench and showed no signs of having been in the river. The dog's harness was found on the ground between the bench and the river.

Investigation

Police 
After the report of Bulley's disappearance, Lancashire Constabulary immediately graded Bulley as "high risk" because of "specific vulnerabilities" due to "significant issues with alcohol which were brought on by her ongoing struggles with the menopause". The classification increased the priority and resources assigned to the investigation.

The search for Bulley was initially focused on tracing a potential witness, a woman in a red coat spotted on CCTV walking a dog near the site of Bulley's disappearance. She was later identified as a 68-year-old woman, who confirmed she had not seen Bulley. On 4 February, police released a CCTV image of another woman who was seen, pushing a pram, in the area at the time of Bulley's disappearance; the police later reported that the woman had come forward very quickly.

Searches of the river and riverbank from St Michael's on Wyre to the sea found nothing of interest. On 3 February, Lancashire Constabulary stated that they believed the circumstances of Bulley's disappearance were not suspicious, nor criminal and did not involve a third party. Police speculation that Bulley had fallen into the River Wyre was met with criticism and scepticism by Bulley's family and friends. They stated that the hypothesis was unsupported by evidence, whilst Bulley's partner said that he  was convinced she was not in the river. A Lancashire Constabulary superintendent reiterated that this remained the force's working hypothesis, and they were "as sure as [they] can be" that Bulley had not left the area.

The search involved police divers, a helicopter, sniffer dogs and drones, and was assisted by the Coastguard, Mountain Rescue and fire crews. Members of the public helped with the search, and police requested the community look out for the clothing Bulley was known to be wearing. She had worn her Fitbit, although its last data synchronization was before her disappearance and its account was not useful to the investigation. On 9 February, the search moved to Morecambe Bay, the mouth of the River Wyre.

At a press conference held on 15 February by Assistant Chief Constable Peter Lawson and Detective Superintendent Rebecca Smith, Lancashire Constabulary stated that there remained no evidence of criminal activity nor of third-party involvement in Bulley's disappearance. Smith was critical of users of social media such as TikTok, who had visited the area "[playing] private detectives"; she stated that false information, speculation and rumour had been detrimental to the police investigation and had adversely affected Bulley's family. Later the same day, the police clarified comments in the conference referring to Bulley's "specific vulnerabilities" by specifying that they related to alcohol and the menopause, and also stated that police had attended a concern for welfare report at her home on 10 January. Police also put in place a dispersal order, after social media video-makers caused a nuisance and disrupted the investigation.

Private search team
Peter Faulding led an independent search effort by his company, Specialist Group International, that used side-scan sonar. He described Bulley's disappearance as "strange" and said that in his 20-year career he had "never seen something so unusual". After an extensive search of the River Wyre, the underwater team concluded their operation. Faulding said that his team were unable to locate her in the area of the River Wyre where detectives thought she may have entered the water, stating: "That area is completely negative—there is no sign of Nicola in that area. The main focus will be the police investigation down the river, which leads out to the estuary." Faulding believed it was unlikely that Bulley had been swept out to sea, adding, "My personal view is that I think it is a long way to go in a tidal river."

Recovery of body

The couple informed the police, and the body – which was among reeds and undergrowth – was subsequently recovered. Police set up a tent beside the river and a police helicopter operated above the area. Some members of the public tried to take photos of the body by climbing over a fence and pretending to be journalists; a man was later arrested for a malicious communications offence and perverting the course of justice relating to him recording video within the police cordon.

On 20 February, Lancashire Constabulary confirmed that the body was Bulley's. She was identified from dental records. The cause of death has not yet been established. An inquest opened on 22 February at Preston coroner's court, before senior coroner James Adeley and, once identification was confirmed, adjourned until a date probably in June 2023.

Criticism of the media and of Lancashire Police
After confirming Bulley's death at a press conference, Lancashire Police read a statement from Bulley's family in which they condemned the actions of Sky News and ITV News for making contact directly with them when they had expressly requested privacy, describing the conduct of media outlets as "shameful". The family also criticised people who accused Bulley's partner of involvement in her disappearance. Baroness Wheatcroft, former editor of the Sunday Telegraph, said the media had invaded the family's privacy, calling it a "feeding frenzy". On 21 February, the broadcasting regulator Ofcom said it was "extremely concerned" to hear complaints about media conduct made by Bulley's family, and that it had written to both ITV and Sky News to ask them to explain their actions.

The police's revelation of Bulley's health details was criticised by many. Home Secretary Suella Braverman asked the force to justify its decision. Vera Baird commented that, if publicising the details would have aided the search, it should have been done immediately and said otherwise she thought it sexist. Prime Minister Rishi Sunak and Leader of the Opposition Keir Starmer both expressed concerns; other critics included Leader of the House of Commons Penny Mordaunt, and MPs Stella Creasy and Alicia Kearns. The Information Commissioner's Office has also contacted the force with regard to the release of personal information. Lancashire Constabulary's media strategy as a whole has been criticised as having encouraged rumour and speculation.

Guardian columnist Zoe Williams called police discussion of Bulley's health "the worst judgment call on the police's part [...] There was no call for that level of detail; it appeared to be introduced purely to discredit her as a rational actor." Williams extended her criticism to the general public, via social media, which reacted entirely contrarily, in her opinion, to how reason and tact would dictate in the early stages of the case when police released minimal information. "Everything the police left unsaid opened a vacuum, into which armchair detectives and keyboard warriors piled with conspiracies, speculation and fantasy. The glee and shamelessness of people broadcasting their vigilante investigations was chilling", extending to one YouTuber broadcasting himself joining the search, getting arrested on a public order charge for doing so, and then broadcasting himself again getting fined. When the theories circulating forced the police to hold their 15 February news conference to debunk them, she noted, two Daily Mail columnists tweeted links to columns criticising Detective Superintendent Smith for having worn a sleeveless dress. "It's a crowded field but this may have been a low point for traditional media," she wrote.

Reviews of the police's approach were opened by the Independent Office for Police Conduct after self-referral by the Lancashire Constabulary and by the College of Policing at the request of the Lancashire Police and Crime Commissioner, Andrew Snowden. Lancashire Constabulary also began an internal review into their handling of the case. Later in February, Specialist Group International, who had conducted the unsuccessful sonar searches of the river, were removed from the National Crime Agency's Expert Advisers Database, pending a review of the case by the NCA.

See also

List of solved missing person cases
List of unsolved deaths
Missing white woman syndrome

References

2023 in England
2020s in Lancashire
2020s missing person cases
Borough of Wyre
February 2023 events in the United Kingdom
January 2023 events in the United Kingdom
Missing person cases in England
Unsolved deaths